Sattam Oru Iruttarai is a 2012 Tamil language film directed by Sneha Britto, which is a remake of the 1981 film of the same name by S. A. Chandrasekhar. The film stars Thaman Kumar and Bindu Madhavi while Erode Mahesh and Reema Sen  amongst others play supporting roles. Pia Bajpai plays a Guest role in the film. The film marks the acting debut of Erode Mahesh as well as the last featured film for actress, Reema Sen prior to her marriage and further retirement to take care and concentrate on her family more.

Cast

 Thaman Kumar as Vijay
 Bindu Madhavi as Diya
 Erode Mahesh as Kumar
 Piaa Bajpai as Jessamine/Jess (Special role)
 Reemma Sen as Kausalya Raman
 Suresh
 Radha Ravi
 Sampath Ram as Anand
 Baby Rakshana as Shalu
 Thangadurai
 Boys Rajan
 Swaminathan
 Krishnamoorthy
 Scissor Manohar
 S. A. Chandrasekhar (Guest Role) as Sub Inspector of Police

Production
In February 2012, Vijay announced his desire to remake his father S. A. Chandrasekhar's 1981 political drama Sattam Oru Iruttarai under his new production house of Ghilli Films and signed on Vikram Prabhu, son of actor Prabhu, to feature in the film. Piaa Bajpai signed lead actresses and Karthika Nair signed Supporting role, both of whom had appeared together in K. V. Anand's Ko, while newcomer Sneha, a visual communications graduate, was signed on as director. Despite early reports that Meena would be approached to play a role, Reemma Sen was subsequently signed on to play the powerful character of the police officer in the film, her first role after her marriage, while C. J. Rajkumar and Vijay Antony were announced as cinematographer and music composer of the project respectively.
 The film continued its shoot in Pondicherry in May 2012.

In June 2012, Vikram Prabhu revealed that he had trouble accommodating the film as his previous venture Kumki required the climax to be re-shot and thus asked the team to temporarily stall the project til October 2012 or find a new actor. Chandrasekhar went on to clarify that alternatives were being considered and the team were hoping to rope in either one of the actors Aadhi, Arun Vijay or Vishnu as a replacement or to pick a debutant. In mid June 2012, Chandrasekhar revealed that Vikram Prabhu had finally opted out of the project and following his departure,Piaa Bajpai more interest Bindhu Madhavi in this movie.Piaa bajpai playing supporting role in this movie but Karthika Nair not accepted lead role.karthika nair pulled out. Newcomer Arjun was first reported to have signed on to play the lead role, while Thananya, previously seen in Kunguma Poovum Konjum Puravum (2009), was also reported to have been roped in to replace Karthika. However this proved untrue, with Sneha confirming that newcomer Thaman Kumar would replace Vikram Prabhu, while Bindu Madhavi would also form a part of the final cast.

After the film re-began in July 2012, the title was changed from Sattam Oru Iruttarai to Thozhan and supporting actors Radha Ravi and Suresh were added to the cast. However, as of December 2012, the original title is being used.

Soundtrack
Soundtrack was composed by Vijay Antony.

Critical reception
Behindwoods wrote:"The premise of 2012’s Sattam Oru Iruttarai (SOI) is in essence the same as the original. Sneha Britto has many years ahead of her and should treat this as an opportunity that not many are provided with. ".
CNN-IBN wrote:"Thaman Kumar showed signs of confidence, but struggled overall to deliver a satisfying performance".

References

2012 films
Remakes of Indian films
2010s Tamil-language films
Films shot in Puducherry
Films scored by Vijay Antony
Indian films about revenge
Indian vigilante films
2012 directorial debut films